Krzysztof Łyżwa (born 28 May 1990) is a Polish handball player for KS Azoty-Puławy and the Polish national handball team.

He participated at the 2017 World Men's Handball Championship.

References

1990 births
Living people
Polish male handball players
People from Ostrów Wielkopolski
Expatriate handball players
Polish expatriates in the Czech Republic
Sportspeople from Greater Poland Voivodeship